The following is a list of albums and singles released on DualDisc.

The DVD side of some DualDiscs is DVD-Audio formatted. However, other releases instead have a standard DVD-Video format DVD side, typically including the album audio in standard-resolution stereo and/or 5.1 surround sound, rather than the high-resolution audio typical of DVD-Audio.

DualDisc releases